Ojacastro is a village in the province and autonomous community of La Rioja, Spain.

Demographics

Population centres
 Ojacastro
 Amunartia
 Arviza
 Escarza
 Espidia
 Larrea
 Masoa
 Matalturra
 San Asensio de los Cantos
 Tondeluna
 Ulizarna
 Uyarra
 Zabárrula

Notable people
 José Juan Bautista Merino Urrutia, historian.

References

Populated places in La Rioja (Spain)